John Blount (died 1417), of Dorchester, Dorset, was an English politician, sadler and cloth merchant.

He was a Member (MP) of the Parliament of England for Dorchester in January 1390, 1395, 1399, January 1404 and April 1414. He was the younger brother of Peter Blount, who was also an MP.

References

14th-century births
1417 deaths
Members of the Parliament of England for Dorchester
English MPs January 1390
English MPs 1395
English MPs 1399
English MPs January 1404
English MPs April 1414